

The Aerosport Quail is an ultralight aircraft that was designed for home building by Harris Woods.
First offered for sale in 1971, by the end of the decade, 375 sets of plans had been sold, with around 26 aircraft under construction and 10 flying.

Design
The Quail is an all-metal cantilever high-wing monoplane with an enclosed cabin and tricycle undercarriage. The aircraft uses simple flat-sided construction with pop-rivet assembly. The wing design is unmodified from the Aerosport Rail homebuilt. The prototype was powered with a Rockwell L680R engine.

On Display
There are Quails on display at the North Carolina Aviation Museum in Asheboro, North Carolina, and the Pima Air Museum in Tucson, Arizona.

Specifications (Aerosport Quail)

References

Quail
Homebuilt aircraft
1970s United States civil utility aircraft
Single-engined tractor aircraft
High-wing aircraft